Perris–South is a train station in Perris, California, United States, near Menifee, that opened on June 6, 2016, along with the Perris Valley Line extension of the Metrolink commuter rail system. The station consists of a single track with a side platform.

The station contains six bus docks which were previously served by the Riverside Transit Agency, but service was later eliminated with the agency focusing on serving the Perris–Downtown station instead.

References

External links 

Metrolink stations in Riverside County, California
2016 establishments in California
Railway stations in the United States opened in 2016
Perris, California